Fernando Casanova Aizpún (born 30 October 1988) in Santo Domingo is a Dominican international footballer who plays as a midfielder for Bauger FC in the Dominican Republic First Division.

Career
Casanova has played college soccer for Ithaca College.

He made his international debut for Dominican Republic in 2011, and has appeared in FIFA World Cup qualifying matches.

References

1988 births
Living people
Dominican Republic footballers
Dominican Republic international footballers
Ithaca College alumni
Association football midfielders